Minbwe is a village in Homalin Township, Hkamti District, in the Sagaing Region of northwestern Burma. It is located on the Chindwin River, to the northeast of Mezali.

References

External links
Maplandia World Gazetteer

Populated places in Hkamti District
Homalin Township